Rumney may refer to:

People
 Bernard Rumney (c. 1700–1790), English bard and musician
 Edgar Rumney (1936–2015), English professional footballer
 Harold Rumney (1907–1987), Australian rules footballer
 Jack Rumney (1898–1969), English footballer
 Ralph Rumney (1934–2002), English artist

Places
 Rumney, Cardiff, Wales
 Rumney, New Hampshire, United States
 Electoral division of Rumney, Tasmania

Other uses
 Rumney wine, produced in Greece in the 14th to 16th centuries

See also
 Rhymney, a town in Wales
 Rhymney River, Wales